Santa Eulalia de Oscos (Eonavian: Santalla d'Ozcos) is a municipality in the Autonomous Community of the Principality of Asturias, Spain. It is bordered on the north by Villanueva de Oscos, on the south and west by Lugo province of Galicia, and on the east by Villanueva de Oscos, San Martín de Oscos and Grandas de Salime.

The municipality consists of only one parish, Santa Eulalia (Santalla).

References

External links
Federación Asturiana de Concejos
Guia del Occidente. Santa Eulalia de Oscos

Municipalities in Asturias